Esa muchacha de ojos café (English title: That Girl With Coffee-Colored Eyes) is a Venezuelan telenovela written by Fausto Verdial and produced and aired on Venevisión between 1986 and 1987.

Alba Roversi and Carlos Olivier star as the main protagonists with Elluz Peraza and Aroldo Betancourt as antagonists.

Plot
Amelia San José owns a bar called El campeón but finds herself in prison after a false complaint. Her two children Chuíto and Carita take refuge in the house of Angélica Subero who is popularly referred to as Doña Brava. Although Angélica lives in a barrio, she is a member of the wealthy Subero family which is made up of Daniel, his wife Graciela and their two adopted children María Gracia and Miguel. Graciela lives with jealousy obsessed that there is another woman in her husband's life. Although Daniel denies it, he has been having an affair with Belén Leirado, his advisor at his company who is also Graciela's close friend. Meanwhile, there is another branch of the Subero family that has been forgotten. Juan Pedro Subero had grown up in exile after his parents were disinherited. Juan Pedro decides to come to the city to claim his rights over the family fortune, and arrives at the house of his aunt Angélica. There he will fall in love with Carita, but a fierce rivalry will form with his cousin Miguel over Carita's affections, while María Gracia also becomes obsessed with him.

Cast
Alba Roversi as Caridad San José "Carita"
Carlos Olivier as Juan Pedro Subero
Elluz Peraza as María Gracia Subero
Aroldo Betancourt as Miguel Subero
Daniel Alvarado as Daniel Subero
Miriam Ochoa as Belén Leirado
Irene Arcila as Angélica Subero "Doña Brava"
María Cristina Lozada as Graciela de Subero "Grachi"
Agustina Martin as Amelia San José
Yolanda Méndez as Sol Patria Oteiza
Freddy Galavis as Perecito
Javier Díaz as Luis García Bravo
Angélica Arenas as Patricia
Laura Zerra as Maigualita Ferranz "Maigualida"
Henry Lavat as Fermín
Alejo Felipe as Gabriel Subero
Patricia Noguera as Alexa
Ernesto Balzi
Carlos Carrero as Chuíto
Carlos Subero as Francisco Oteiza
Judith Vásquez as Fátima Arguedes
Soraya Sanz as Florita
Yadira Santana as Elba Machado
Francisco Ferrari as Pelayo
Jessica Dell' Ovo as Danielita Subero

References

External links 

1986 telenovelas
Venevisión telenovelas
1980s Venezuelan television series
1986 Venezuelan television series debuts
1987 Venezuelan television series endings
Venezuelan telenovelas
Spanish-language telenovelas
Television shows set in Venezuela